Mordellistena paraintersecta is a species of beetle in the genus Mordellistena of the family Mordellidae. It was described by Ermisch in 1965 and can be found in countries such as Greece, Hungary, southern part of Russia and Near East.

References

Beetles described in 1965
paraintersecta
Beetles of Europe